The 2010 FIRS Women's Roller Hockey World Cup or Alcobendas 2010 was the 10th edition of the CIRH Women's World Cup. It was held in September and October 2010 in Alcobendas, Spain.

Participating nations

Preliminary round
All times are (UTC+02)

Group A

Group B

Group C

Group D

Knockout stage

Championship

5th–8th playoff

9th–16th playoff

13th–16th playoff

Final standing

See also
Ladies Rink Hockey World Championship

External links
 Official Site
Official Blog of the 10th Ladies Rink Hockey World Championship 2010

Women's Roller Hockey World Cup
R
2010 World Championship
Roller
Sport in Alcobendas
World
2010 in the Community of Madrid